David Stokes may refer to:
 David Stokes (soccer) (born 1982), American soccer player
 David Stokes (Guatemalan footballer) (born 1946)
 David Stokes (English footballer) (1880–?)
 David Stokes (priest) (died 1669), Canon of Windsor
 Norm Stokes (David Norman Stokes, 1909–2004), New Zealand cricketer